Thabelo Muvhango (born 7 May 2000) is a South African international lawn bowler and national champion. She has represented South Africa at the Commonwealth Games and won a silver medal.

Biography
Muvhango won a national title when winning the pairs with Colleen Piketh, at the 2021 South African National Bowls Championships.

She was selected for the 2022 Commonwealth Games in Birmingham, where she competed in the women's triples and the women's fours event, reaching the final and winning a silver medal. Along with Esme Kruger, Johanna Snyman, and Bridget Calitz they lost in the final 17-10 to India.

References

2000 births
Living people
South African female bowls players
Bowls players at the 2022 Commonwealth Games
Commonwealth Games medallists in lawn bowls
Commonwealth Games bronze medallists for South Africa
Medallists at the 2022 Commonwealth Games